Ulotrichopus tinctipennis is a moth of the family Noctuidae first described by George Hampson in 1902. It is found in Botswana, Burkina Faso, Djibouti, Egypt, Ethiopia, Kenya, Mauritania, Namibia, Nigeria, Oman, Saudi Arabia, Somalia, Sudan, Eswatini, Tanzania, United Arab Emirates, Yemen, Zimbabwe, Israel and Jordan.

There is one generation per year. Adults are on wing from December to April.

References

External links
Image

Ulotrichopus
Moths of Africa
Moths of the Middle East
Moths described in 1902